The Pittman Act was a United States federal law sponsored by Senator Key Pittman of Nevada and enacted on April 23, 1918. The Act authorized the conversion of not exceeding 350,000,000 standard silver dollars into bullion and its sale or use for subsidiary silver coinage, and directed purchase of domestic silver for recoinage of a like number of dollars. For each silver dollar converted into bullion, the Act also called for the temporary removal from circulation of an equivalent value of Silver Certificates. These certificates were to be temporarily replaced with a new issuance of Federal Reserve Bank Notes, including  and  denominations for the first time.

The passage of the Pittman Act led to most coins of lesser value having much lower mintages in 1921, and no mintages at all, in 1922 — echoing what happened after the Bland-Allison Act of 1878 was passed, which also resumed the coinage of silver dollars.

Further provisions relating to silver coinage were contained in the Thomas Amendment to the Agricultural Adjustment Act of 1933.

See also
 Executive Order 6102
 Executive Order 6814

References

External links
 The Pittman Act

1919 in law
United States federal currency legislation
1918 in the United States